Henry James (1843–1916) was an American author

Henry James may also refer to:
Henry James (Regius Professor) (died 1717), English priest and theologian
Sir Henry James (British Army officer) (1803–1877), director-general of the Ordnance Survey
Henry James Sr. (1811–1882), American theologian, father of the author
Henry James, 1st Baron James of Hereford (1828–1911), English lawyer and statesman
Sir H. E. M. James (Henry Evan Murchison James, 1846–1923), British officer in the Indian Civil Service, explorer and writer
Henry James (Dean of Bangor) (1864–1949), Dean of Bangor Cathedral, 1934–1940
Henry James (biographer) (1879–1947), winner of the 1931 Pulitzer Prize for Biography or Autobiography, nephew of the author
Henry James (basketball) (born 1965), American basketball player

See also
Harry James (disambiguation)